Georges-Olivier Châteaureynaud (born 1947 in Paris) is a French novelist and short story writer. He was awarded the Prix Renaudot in 1982 for the novel La Faculté des songes and the Prix Goncourt de la nouvelle in 2005 for Singe savant tabassé par deux clowns. He has been general secretary of the Prix Renaudot since 2010.

Biography 
Georges-Olivier Châteaureynaud was born in Paris in 1947. After the divorce of his parents, he lived alone with his mother, first in a maid's room in Paris and then in suburban cities. His childhood is marked by precariousness - housing difficulties in the post-war years - and his mother's depression. The paternal grandfather, an official in the Ministry of Finance, is his paternal figure. With his grandparents, uncles, aunts and cousins, he spent all his holidays in Brittany. These biographical elements are to be found in many of Châteaureynaud's texts, always from the point of view of fiction. His work should not be regarded as autobiographical, with the exception of La Vie nous regarde passer, where Châteaureynaud evokes his childhood and youth, his years of training, the discovery of literature (especially fantastic) and his meeting with his future companions.
 
In the 1970s, he and his friend Hubert Haddad founded several literary magazines, with only a few deliveries, but which definitely oriented his literary commitment.

In 1973 he published Le Fou dans la chaloupe at Éditions Grasset, a collection of three books of three long stories, and in 1974 the novel  The Messengers , which won the Prix des Nouvelles littérares. Until the Renaudot was awarded in 1982, he earned his living by successively working as a cashier, a truck driver at the Saviem, a dealer, a librarian, while continuing his literary work.

Georges-Olivier Châteaureynaud won the Prix Renaudot for La Faculté des songes in 1982. Since 1996, he has been a member of the jury for this award. He is part of the current called magic realism. Olivier Châtaureynaud chaired the Société des gens de lettres from 2000 to 2002 and is now one of the directors. He is a member of numerous literary juries including the Prix Bretagne. Since 2010, he has been general secretary of the Prix Renaudot.

Work 
The author of an important work - one hundred short-stories and nine novels published to date - Chateaureynaud builds a personal and poetic universe. His texts, which are often described as fantastic, are rather related to the dream domain. There is nothing gory or bloody in his writings, but a peculiar vision of the world and of society, which deliberately deviates from social observation and autofiction.

In particular, Châteaureynaud developed his ideas on fantasy in his preface to Divinités du Styx , an anthology of the stories of Marcel Schneider, one of his avowed models. After referring to the very diverse ways in which Schneider and Roger Caillois have spoken of the fantastic, Châteaureynaud rejected Caillois's conception that fear would necessarily be a predominant feeling in fantastic literature. "(preface to Divinités du Styx, p. 21).</ref> On many occasions, Chateaureynaud thus expressed the high opinion that he, like Marcel Schneider, has of the prestige of fantastic, a literature according to him better able than the different realistic currents to grasp the reality of being.

He is one of the artisans of the revival of short story in France in the 1970s, with Annie Saumont, Claude Pujade-Renaud or Christiane Baroche.
 

Bibliography 
1973: Le Fou dans la chaloupe, Grasset
1974 Les Messagers, Grasset and Actes Sud, 1997
1976: La Belle charbonnière, Grasset
1978: Mathieu Chain, Grasset
1982: La Faculté des songes, Grasset, Prix Renaudot, 
1985: Le Congrès de fantomologie, Grasset
1989: Le Jardin dans l'île
1993: Nouvelles, 1972-1988, Juillard
1994: Le Château de verre, Julliard
1994: La Fortune, 
1996: Les Ormeaux, Éditions du Rocher
1996: Le Jardin dans l’île (et autre nouvelles), Librio
1997: Le Kiosque et le Tilleul, Actes Sud
1997: Le Goût de l'ombre, Actes Sud
1999: La Conquête du Pérou, Ed. du Rocher
1999: Le Héros blessé au bras, Actes Sud
1999: Le Démon à la crécelle, Grasset
2002: Civils de plomb, Ed. du Rocher
2002: Les Amants sous verre, Le Verger
2004: Au fond du paradis, Grasset
2004: L’Ange et les Démons, Grasset
2004: Petite suite cherbourgeoise, with Hubert Haddad and Frédérick Tristan, Le Rocher
2005: Singe savant tabassé par deux clowns, Grasset, Prix Goncourt de la nouvelle
2006: Les Intermittences d'Icare, 
2006: Mécomptes cruels, Rhubarbe
2007, L’Autre Rive, Grasset, Grand prix de l'Imaginaire
2010: Le Corps de l’autre, Grasset
2011: La Vie nous regarde passer, Grasset
2011: , 
2013: Jeune vieillard assis sur une pierre en bois, Grasset,
2014: C'était écrit, Rhubarbe
2016: Le Goût de l’ombre, Grasse
 
The works of Georges-Olivier Châteaureynaud have been translated into some fifteen languages. Last translation to this day:
2010 A life on paper, selection of short stories, English translation by Edward Gauvin, Small Beer Press, New-York

About the author 
2010: Christine Bini, Le Marbre et la Brume : L'univers littéraire de Georges-Olivier Châteaureynaud, Alphée

References

External links 
 Site de l'auteur
 Nouvelle de G.- O. Châteaureynaud  Le Tout Petit, à lire en ligne sur le blog de Michel Volkovitch
 Critique du roman Le Corps de l'autre sur le site Actualitté
 Critique du roman L'Autre Rive in Télérama
 Le blog d'Edward Gauvin (en), le traducteur américain de Châteaureynaud. Nombreux articles sur l'auteur
 

20th-century French male writers
20th-century French novelists
21st-century French novelists
French male short story writers
French short story writers
Prix Goncourt de la nouvelle recipients
Prix Valery Larbaud winners
Prix Renaudot winners
Writers from Paris
1947 births
Living people
21st-century French male writers